Her Social Value is a 1921 American drama film directed by Jerome Storm and written by Gerald Duffy and Jerome Storm. The film stars Katherine MacDonald, Roy Stewart, Bertram Grassby, Betty Ross Clarke, Winter Hall, and Joseph W. Girard. The film was released on October 24, 1921, by Associated First National Pictures.

Cast      
Katherine MacDonald as Marion Hoyte
Roy Stewart as James Lodge
Bertram Grassby as Clifford Trent
Betty Ross Clarke as Bertha Harmon
Winter Hall as Shipley
Joseph W. Girard as Joe Harmon 
Lillian Rich as Gwendolyn Shipley
Vincent Hamilton as Leroy Howard
Helen Raymond as Ruth Lodge
Violet Phillips as Belle
Arthur Gibson as The Baby

References

External links

 

1921 films
1920s English-language films
Silent American drama films
1921 drama films
First National Pictures films
Films directed by Jerome Storm
American silent feature films
American black-and-white films
1920s American films